AdventHealth Lake Wales, formerly Lake Wales Medical Center, is a non-profit hospital in Lake Wales, Florida. It was formerly owned by health care provider Community Health Systems but is now owned by AdventHealth.

History
In 1928, Lake Wales opened its first hospital with nine beds. In 1929, money was raised to build to build a 25-bed hospital, which was built in 1930. Additional bedrooms were added in 1948 and 1956, increasing the number of beds to 60. In 1965, a new 110-bed hospital was built. Nine years later the third floor opened, increasing the number of beds to 154, and the original hospital was made into medical office space. In 1985, the Deeley A. Hunt Building a 120-bed Extended Care Facility building was built next to the hospital. On December 2, 2002 it was purchased by Community Health Systems from Winter Haven Hospital.

In May 2019, AdventHealth bought Lake Wales Medical Center from Community Health Systems for $10.146 million. On September 1, 2019, AdventHealth officially took over the management of Lake Wales Medical Center. It was renamed AdventHealth Lake Wales and joined AdventHealth Central Florida Division.

Ratings
The HealthGrades website provides rating data for Lake Wales Hospital. Of the twelve patient safety indicators listed, Lake Wales scored three below average, seven average and two better than average. Patient survey data on the HealthGrades website says 63% of patients gave the hospital a 9 or 10, which is a high rating. Nationally, 69% of patients gave hospitals a 9 or 10. HealthGrades provided data on ratings in 17 specialties. Sixteen of these were rated as average (3 stars). One was rated as worse (1 star). This rating scheme only allows three options to be recorded, 1, 3 or 5 stars; there are no options of giving 2 or 4 stars.

References

External links
 

Hospital buildings completed in 1930
Hospitals in Florida
Buildings and structures in Lake Wales, Florida
Community Health Systems
AdventHealth